Nicolas Hibst (12 October 1915 – 21 January 1959) was a French association football player and manager. During his career, he played in Division 1 and Division 2 with FC Metz and AS Saint-Étienne and was part of the Metz side which lost the 1938 Coupe de France final.

His first foray into coaching came when he took charge of Division 1 side Metz in 1946. After just one season, he left to manage Lens where he guided the Division 2 outfit to the 1948 Coupe de France final and to the Division 2 championship the following season. His career finished when he left Division 3 club Chamois Niortais in 1953, after a three-year tenure. Hibst died in Saint-Avold in January 1959 at the age of 43.

References

External links
Nicolas Hibst's profile at chamoisfc79.fr
Nicolas Hibst's profile at FC Metz official site

1915 births
1959 deaths
French footballers
French football managers
Association football midfielders
Ligue 1 players
FC Metz players
AS Saint-Étienne players
FC Metz managers
RC Lens managers
Chamois Niortais F.C. managers
Sportspeople from Meurthe-et-Moselle
Footballers from Grand Est